David Stern (1942–2020) was an American lawyer, businessman and commissioner of the National Basketball Association.

David Stern may also refer to:
David Stern (academic), American scholar of Hebrew literature 
David Stern (businessman) (1820–1875), German-born American businessman
David Stern (Israeli politician) (1910–2003), Israeli politician
David M. Stern, writer for The Wonder Years and The Simpsons and brother of actor Daniel Stern
David E. Stern (born 1961), senior rabbi at Temple Emanu-El in Dallas, Texas
David H. Stern (born 1935), American-born Messianic Jewish theologian in Israel
David Stern (activist), CEO of Equal Justice Works
David D. Stern (born 1956), German-born artist in New York 
David Stern (conductor) (born 1963), American conductor
David Stern III (1909–2003), American newspaper manager who created Francis the Talking Mule
J. David Stern (1886–1971), American newspaper publisher

See also
David de Stern (1807–1877), British banker
David Stearns (born 1985), American baseball executive as president/general manager of the Milwaukee Brewers
David Sterne (born 1946), British actor